The 1893–94 season was the 21st Scottish football season in which Dumbarton competed at national level, entering the Scottish Football League and the Scottish Cup. In addition Dumbarton played in the Dumbartonshire Cup.

Scottish League

The demand for league football nationally resulted in the creation of a new second division.  Meanwhile, Dumbarton competed in their first season as a professional outfit.  From now on it would be a 'big ask' for the club to compete with the larger outfits as they could not generate the required funds to attract the best talent. Nevertheless, a creditable 5th place in the First Division was achieved with 19 points, 10 behind champions Celtic.

Scottish Cup

After a first round win over local rivals Vale of Leven, Dumbarton were defeated in the second round by St Bernards.

Dumbartonshire Cup
Dumbarton retained the Dumbartonshire Cup, defeating Duntocher Harp in the final.

Friendlies
During the season 17 'friendly' matches were played, including a 'mini' north of England tour during the New Year holidays.  In all, 6 were won, 5 drawn and 6 lost, scoring 41 goals and conceding 39.

Player statistics
Despite the switch to professionalism, Dumbarton struggled to hold on to their 'star' players and during the season lost, amongst others, internationalist John Taylor who moved to St Mirren.

|}

Source:

International caps
John Taylor earned his third and fourth 'League' caps in Scottish League XI's against the Irish and English Leagues respectively - scoring a goal in the 6-2 win over the Irish.

Tom McMillan also earned his first 'League' cap in the match against the Irish League.

Reserve team
Dumbarton were defeated in the second round of the Scottish Second XI Cup by Celtic.

References

Dumbarton F.C. seasons
Scottish football clubs 1893–94 season